Bart Piet Jozef van Winsen (born 27 August 1943 in Lochem) is a former Dutch politician for the Christian Democratic Appeal (Christen-Democratisch Appèl).

He was a member of the municipal council of Haaksbergen from 1982 to 2002, and also an alderman of this Twente municipality from 1986 to 2002. Afterwards he was an MP from 2002 to 2006.

Van Winsen studied history at Utrecht University and political science at Radboud University Nijmegen. He worked as a teacher.

References 
  Parlement.com biography

1943 births
Living people
Aldermen in Overijssel
Christian Democratic Appeal politicians
Dutch educators
Members of the House of Representatives (Netherlands)
Municipal councillors in Overijssel
People from Haaksbergen
People from Lochem
Radboud University Nijmegen alumni
Utrecht University alumni